Elayis Tavşan (born 30 April 2001) is a Dutch professional footballer who plays as forward for NEC.

Club career
On 19 August 2019, he joined Telstar on a season-long loan. On 15 June 2020, he signed a three-year contract with NEC with an option for an additional season. He made his debut against Jong Ajax in the second matchday of the season. He played 84 minutes, after which he was substituted for Thomas Beekman. The match after that, he scored his first goal for the club, in the 3–1 away match against FC Volendam.

Personal life
Tavşan was born in the Netherlands and is of Turkish and Surinamese descent.

Honours

Netherlands U17
 UEFA European Under-17 Championship: 2018

Individual
Eredivisie Talent of the Month: October 2021

References

2001 births
Living people
Dutch footballers
Footballers from Rotterdam
Netherlands youth international footballers
Dutch people of Turkish descent
Dutch sportspeople of Surinamese descent
Association football forwards
Eredivisie players
Eerste Divisie players
Tweede Divisie players
Sparta Rotterdam players
SC Telstar players
NEC Nijmegen players